Moses Lenolkula Kasaine (born 1976) is a Kenyan politician. He is the governor of Samburu County, Kenya. He has three children and a wife

References

1976 births
Living people
County Governors of Kenya
Date of birth missing (living people)
Place of birth missing (living people)